Sprengelia monticola, commonly known as rock sprengelia, is a species of flowering plant of the family Ericaceae, and is endemic to the Blue Mountains in eastern New South Wales. It is an open or low-lying shrub with egg-shaped to lance-shaped leaves, and white flowers arranged singly in leaf axils.

Description
The flowers are arranged singly in leaf axils, with tapering, egg-shaped bracts at the base.

Taxonomy
This species was first formally described in 1839 by Augustin Pyramus de Candolle in Prodromus Systematis Naturalis Regni Vegetabilis and was given the name Ponceletia monticola from an unpublished description by Allan Cunningham. In 1917, George Claridge Druce changed the name to Sprengelia monticola in the supplement to The Botanical Exchange Club and Society of the British Isles Report for 1916. The specific epithet (monticola) means "dweller in mountains".

Habitat and distribution
Rock sprengelia grows on wet sandstone rocks and cliff ledges in the Blue Mountains of eastern New South Wales, often with cliff ledge vegetation such as king fern (Todea barbara) and Dracophyllum secundum.

References

Epacridoideae
monticola
Ericales of Australia
Flora of New South Wales
Plants described in 1839
Taxa named by Alphonse Pyramus de Candolle